The men's hammer throw at the 2018 IAAF World U20 Championships was held at Ratina Stadium on 11 and 13 July.

Records

Results

Qualification
The qualification round took place on 11 July in two groups, with Group A starting at 12.20 and Group B starting at 13:40. Athletes attaining a mark of at least 74.00 metres ( Q ) or at least the 12 best performers ( q ) qualified for the final.

Final
The final took place on 13 July at 17:50.

References

hammer throw
Hammer throw at the World Athletics U20 Championships